Jennifer Luebke (born April 1, 1986) is an American professional racing cyclist. She signed to ride for the UCI Women's Team  for the 2019 women's road cycling season.

References

External links
 

1986 births
Living people
American female cyclists
Place of birth missing (living people)
21st-century American women